Marinopoulos Super Markets was a Greek retailer. It was formed in 1995 as a 50-50 joint venture between the Greek Marinopoulos Group and the French Carrefour Group, but, in 2012, Carrefour decided to withdraw from the joint venture due to the Greek crisis. It was the biggest retail chain in Greece in terms of both turnover and number of stores. As of 2015, the company operates over 700 stores. Carrefour Marinopoulos in 2013 had a revenue of €1.74 billion and profits €131 million. Marinopoulos brothers have a fortune of around €270 million.

Stores

Overview
Carrefour Marinopoulos stores are divided into three formats, differentiated by size and the range of products sold.
The larger hypermarkets that stock a wide range of goods are branded Carrefour. Usually these stores are on two floors, ground floor for mainly food and first floor for clothing, electronics etc. There are currently 35 Carrefour hypermarkets located in major Greek cities. 
Medium-sized supermarkets that stock groceries plus a much smaller range of non-food items are branded Carrefour Marinopoulos (Formerly Champion Marinopoulos. This name was used up to the end of 2007). It is the most typical store format accounting for almost half of all Carrefour Marinopoulos stores. There are 276 Marinopoulos stores located all over Greece.
Convenience level stores that stock mainly food are branded  Carrefour Express (formerly 5' Marinopoulos) and Smile Market in the Thessaloniki area. There are over 300 stores of this format located mainly in urban areas.

Carrefour Marinopoulos also owns 11 hypermarkets (branded Carrefour) and 4 supermarkets (branded Carrefour Express) in Cyprus.

The Carrefour Group and the Marinopoulos Group, through a different joint-venture (Dia Hellas SA), also used to control the Dia hard discount stores located in Greece. However, Dia withdrew from Greek market in 2010.

Until the late 1990s the Marinopoulos super markets were operated as Prisunic-Marinopoulos in cooperation with the 1997 closed French chain Prisunic. The mascot was called ΠιΜί and was on all low cost products.

In February 2016, during the Greek economic crisis, collaboration between Marinopoulos and Sklavenitis, another large supermarket chain, was announced, under which Sklavenitis would undertake the management of the Carrefour hypermarkets. The agreement allowed for equal numbers of Marinopoulos and Sklavenitis appointees to be on the board, but the president of the board would be from Sklavenitis.

See also

 Carrefour
 Champion
 List of supermarket chains in Greece

References

External links
 http://www.carrefour.gr/

Supermarkets of Greece
Retail companies established in 1995